Tommy O'Donnell  was an Australian rugby league footballer who played in the 1900s and 1910s.  He played for Balmain and was a foundation player of the club.

Playing career
O'Donnell was a foundation player for Balmain in 1908 and competed in the club's first season which was also the first season of rugby league in Australia.

O'Donnell played in the club's first match against Western Suburbs on 20 April 1908 at Birchgrove Oval.  Balmain went on to win the game 24–0 in front of 3000 spectators with O'Donnell playing at five-eighth.

O'Donnell played with Balmain up until the end of 1910 before retiring.

References

Australian rugby league players
Balmain Tigers players
Rugby league players from Sydney
Rugby league five-eighths
Rugby league halfbacks
Rugby league centres
Place of birth missing
Place of death missing
Year of birth missing
Year of death missing